Staverton is a village between the city of Gloucester and the town of Cheltenham in Gloucestershire, England, in the borough of Tewkesbury. The population taken at the 2011 census was 572.

It is the location of Gloucestershire Airport, which was previously called Staverton Airport and RAF Staverton. It is the home of the Dowty Rotol and Messier-Dowty aircraft components factories. The airport is the largest general aviation airfield in South West England.

References

External links

Villages in Gloucestershire
Borough of Tewkesbury